{{DISPLAYTITLE:C19H24N2}}
The molecular formula C19H24N2 (molar mass: 280.40 g/mol) may refer to:

 Bamipine
 Daledalin
 Histapyrrodine
 Ibogamine
 Imipramine
 Propazepine
 Yohimban

Molecular formulas